The Lost Ship of the Desert is the subject of legends about various historical maritime vessels having supposedly become stranded and subsequently lost in the deserts of the American Southwest, most commonly in California's Colorado Desert. Since the period following the American Civil War, stories about Spanish treasure galleons buried beneath the desert sands north of the Gulf of California have emerged as popular legends in American folklore.

Stories

The "Lost Galleon"
The earliest tales of a lost Spanish galleon appeared shortly after the Colorado River flood of 1862. Colonel Albert S. Evans reported seeing such a ship in 1863. In the Los Angeles Daily News of August 1870, the ship was described as a half-buried hulk in a drying alkali marsh or saline lake, west of Dos Palmas, California, and 40 miles north of Yuma, Arizona. It could easily be viewed at a distance of several miles from a mesa that lay between Dos Palmas and Palma Seca, California. The stories have given Palma Seca other names: Soda Springs, Indian Springs, and Bitter Springs, as the area was not well mapped in 1870. Expeditions were sent out in search of her, but the ship had either never existed or had vanished into the sand and mud once again. The Galleon, according to legend, is now under the waters of the modern Salton Sea.

There are those who claim the ship is Thomas Cavendish's Content, filled with pirate plunder; others claim that she is the Iqueue, a ship of Spanish mutineers.

Pearl ship of Juan de Iturbe
This legend may refer to the same ship as the Lost Galleon, but its own story has always placed it in a distinct location, closer to the sand hills west of El Centro, California. Descriptions suggest it is closer to the size of one of Christopher Columbus' small caravels. The pearl ship is rumored to have been seen as recently as the 1970s.

The story goes that in 1615, Spanish explorer Juan de Iturbe embarked on a pearl-harvesting expedition, during which his crew sailed a shallow-drafted caravel up the Gulf of California. A high tidal bore carried him across a strait into Lake Cahuilla, a postulated contemporaneous saltwater basin periodically connected to the gulf which was already in the process of drying up permanently. After exploring the lake for several days, Iturbe found himself unable to sail out again, whereupon he beached his craft and made his way back to the nearest Spanish settlement on foot, leaving behind a fortune in black pearls. Sixteenth-century records from New Spain indicate that the De La Cadena family had a pearl-diving monopoly in Baja California.

Iturbe's alleged ship has been seen and lost several times, and there are several stories about it having been looted. A mule driver traveling with the de Anza expeditions through Alta California was said to have removed the pearls in 1774. In 1907, a farmhand named Elmer Carver noticed odd-shaped fence posts while working on Niles Jacobsen's farm in Imperial, California. Mrs. Jacobsen claimed a wind storm had revealed the remains of a ship, which the Jacobsens had repurposed into a fence. Mr. Jacobsen had also found gems which he sold in Los Angeles.

The Viking ship, or the "Serpent-Necked Canoe"
The Viking stories originated around 1900 from the Mexicans and Indians who live in the Colorado River delta region near the Laguna Salada basin. The ship is consistently described as an open boat with round metal shields on its sides in the badlands west of Mexicali, Mexico.

Around 1933, Myrtle Botts, a librarian from Julian, California, had an encounter with an old prospector who reported seeing a ship lodged in the rock of Canebrake Canyon. He described the vessel as a Viking ship made of wood with a serpentine figure carved in its prow. He gave her and her husband directions to the location but an earthquake prevented the Botts from following the prospector's trail to the ship. Julian's Pioneer Museum, which inherited Myrtle Botts' papers, also inherited those directions.

The Julian Pioneer Museum is not in possession of any records regarding the Viking ship mentioned in this story.

According to The Last of Seris (Dane Coolidge, 1939), the indigenous people of Tiburón Island reportedly encountered whalers visiting from far away, possibly a reference to Norsemen visiting the west coast of Mexico prior to the Spanish.

Ferry boat or river schooner
This story grew out of an effort to explain or debunk the Lost Galleon story. It is thought that an abandoned ferry or steamboat that had broken away during a Colorado River flood and had been left dry in the vast sands of the river delta is the origin of the rumors. Others claim that it was a schooner that gold-seekers wishing to search the more inaccessible portions of the Colorado River had built in Los Angeles and hauled through the desert by a mule or oxen team until the animals perished, leaving the boat mired in soft sand.

The ferry boat story changed over time more often than the Lost Galleon story. One incarnation said that a small ferry (a two-man sweep) was built away from the river in a place a hundred feet or so above sea level, where a source of wood was found, and that a team of six (or more) oxen perished hauling it through the sand near Los Algodones.

Evaluation of the legends
From a smattering of first-, second- and third-hand accounts, a variety of fictional (especially graphic and cinematic) variations of the Lost Ship stories have been created. Not surprisingly, the first-hand accounts are extremely rare. Many of the above references fit the Lost Mines and Urban Legends molds, where the story passes from ear to ear with all evidence disappearing along the way.

Searching for and finding the remains of a Lost Ship is now rather problematic. The greater part of the Salton Sink has been submerged under the Salton Sea since 1905, and much of the adjacent land is under military control and has even been used for bombing ranges, rendering on-the-ground searches highly hazardous and/or illegal.

Lands adjacent to Laguna Salada in Baja California, and between the Gulf of California and the Salton Sea, regularly receive wind-blown sand from the desiccated delta of the much-diverted Colorado River, generating vast sand dune systems. Aerial searches using ground-penetrating radar might reveal ships' remains, but there has not yet been an agency that undertook this project and revealed its findings. Whether or not any such ships actually existed, the legends persist and remain entertaining to many.

Around AD 1500, the lake was 26 times the present size of the Salton Sea.  It has flooded and dried eight times between 1824 and 1905.  In 1540 Spanish explorer Diaz was in the area, and by 1700 to 1750 the lake had infilled.  Presently there is a "high ground" in Northern Mexico, of 23 feet, or 6+m.  Thus a ship of 8 foot draft would need to have an additional 30 feet of water, above "sea level". While "king tides" of summer and winter are the highest, and conceivably a storm surge could add further water building up, wind-blown up the Sea of Cortez, 30 feet of additional depth seems highly unlikely.

Media renditions of Lost Ship stories
This is a media timeline list of material related to the "lost ship" in the California desert; it shows how the story has changed in each generation's telling.

Note: Although most written items are a paragraph or more long, and sometimes lengthy articles, some are only a brief sentence or two in passing of what the author had heard and thought about a ship in the desert story.

1800s

1900s

2000s

See also
 Mahogany Ship, a similar legend concerning an alleged shipwreck in Victoria, Australia
 Francisco de Ulloa
 Sahara (2005 film)

References

External links
 San Diego Reader. "Stay Away From Pinto Canyon" by Robert Marcos, June 2009. 
 More Lost Ships from the Harry Oliver Fan Center site – tales of submarines, an aircraft carrier, and wagonloads of booze, in the Southern California deserts
 "Lost Ship of the Desert" website
 

American folklore
Colorado Desert
American legends
Maritime folklore